HSBC Insurance (Asia-Pacific) Holdings Limited is part of the worldwide HSBC Group and is wholly owned by The Hongkong and Shanghai Banking Corporation Limited. Its subsidiaries operate as HSBC Insurance (滙豐保險).

History
The history of HSBC Insurance can be traced back to when two important companies were established in Hong Kong, namely; Carlingford Swire Assurance (Bermuda) limited, which was set up in 1981 and subsequently renamed HSBC Life (International) Limited in 1992, and Wardley Insurance Company Limited, which was set up in 1978 and subsequently renamed HSBC Insurance (Asia) Limited in 2000.

Founded in 1970, HSBC Insurance (Asia-Pacific) Holdings Limited was named in 1996 and is now the holding company of HSBC Insurance (Asia) Limited, which in turn wholly owns HSBC Life (International) Limited. Since then, HSBC Insurance has further consolidated its operations in other locations such as Singapore, India, Malaysia and mainland China.

Operations
HSBC Insurance (Asia-Pacific) Holdings Limited holds stakes in a number of insurance companies within the Asia Pacific region including HSBC Insurance (Asia) Limited (100%), HSBC Life Insurance Co Limited, HSBC Life (International) Limited, HSBC Insurance (Singapore) Pte Limited (100%), HSBC Amanah Takaful (Malaysia) Sdn Bhd (49% held) and Canara HSBC Oriental Bank of Commerce Life Insurance Co (26% held).
HSBC Insurance provides insurance products and services to international and local brokers, agents and direct customers in Hong Kong, mainland China, Macau, Singapore, India and Malaysia.

References

External links
HSBC Insurance
HSBC MPF
HSBC Insurance (Singapore)
HSBC Amanah Takaful

Insurance companies of Hong Kong
Insurance
Financial services companies established in 1974
1974 establishments in Hong Kong